Resusci Anne, also known as Rescue Anne, Resusci Annie, CPR Annie, Resuscitation Annie, Little Annie, or CPR Doll is a model of medical simulator used for teaching both emergency workers and members of the general public. Resusci Anne was developed by the Norwegian toy maker Åsmund S. Lærdal and the Austrian-Czech physician Peter Safar and American physician James Elam, and is produced by the company Laerdal Medical.

The distinctive face of Resusci Anne was based on L'Inconnue de la Seine (English: The unknown woman of Seine), the death mask of an unidentified young woman reputedly drowned in the River Seine around the late 1880s.  Åsmund Lærdal chose to use a woman's face on the mannequin as he thought male trainees might be reluctant to kiss a man's face. The face was sculpted by the Norwegian-Danish sculptor Emma Matthiasen (in Norwegian)

The first version of Resusci-Annie was presented by Lærdal at the First International Symposium on Resuscitation at Stavanger, Norway, in 1960. Peter Safar and James Elam were attending the conference. Together they would join Lærdal in refining the design. Later versions would include a simulated carotid pulse, eye-pupils that could dilate and constrict, and a system for recording the trainee's resuscitation performance on a paper tape.

In popular culture
The chorus refrain, "Annie, are you OK?" in Michael Jackson's "Smooth Criminal" was inspired by Resusci Anne.
Trainees learn to say, "Annie, are you OK?" while practicing resuscitation on the dummy.

References

Dummies and mannequins
Medical simulation
Nursing education